Jorge Antonio (October 14, 1917February 11, 2007) was an Argentine business man and political figure, a close adviser to President Juan Domingo Perón.

Early life
Born Jorge Antonio Chibene in La Boca, Buenos Aires to Syrian immigrants (his father was an émigré who arrived in Argentina from Syria in the 19th century, and whose name was Elias Antun Esquef), Antonio grew up in Uruguay and returned to Argentina at 17 years of age. He was an orderly at the National Military Academy in 1942, and worked in several businesses before being appointed as the representative of General Motors and Mercedes Benz in Argentina. In this post, in 1949 he met Perón again, having first met him briefly in 1943, and would become one of Perón's most important advisers.

Association with Peronism
Antonio's fortune grew, connected with his friendship with Juan Duarte, Perón's brother-in-law. In the 1950s, Antonio bought the media companies Radio Belgrano, Canal 7 and the Télam agency. He also invested in agribusiness and owned a bank, building his importance to the Presidency. It was reported that his fortune grew in the ten years to 1955 to US$215 million, and to opponents, Antonio's wealth became emblematic of the cronyism Perón encouraged during his presidency. Among his employees was Adolf Eichmann, under his assumed name of Ricardo Clement. Antonio admitted that he knew Eichmann's real identity. He was often linked with stories of 'Nazi Gold', money brought to Argentina, the United States, and other safe havens by Nazis fleeing Germany.

When Perón was deposed by the military coup of September 1955, Antonio refused to leave the country and was arrested. He was imprisoned for 17 days on a boat, then in Ushuaia for a month and later in Río Gallegos for two years. His properties were seized, and stolen with corrupted judges, by the military. In March 1957, with other Peronist leaders, he escaped from the prison and took refuge in Chile. He was able to fight off Argentine extradition appeals and eventually the government of Chile granted him asylum. In the following years, he lived in Cuba and then in Spain, where he lived for 20 years. Despite animosity from Perón's wife, Isabel, and the couple's chief of staff and fortune-teller, José López Rega,  Antonio was a prominent adviser and financier of the exiled populist leader.

However, in the 1970s Antonio was displaced by José López Rega, and when Perón returned to his country and was re-elected to the Presidency in 1973, Antonio opted to stay in Madrid. Except for a short stay in July 1974, on the occasion of the death of his mentor, Antonio did not return to Argentina until 1977.

He was also friend of Carlos Saúl Menem, under whose presidency he once again became an influential man in the Argentinian business world. He had introduced Menem, also the son of Syrians, to Perón in 1964, though Antonio later distanced himself from the colorful Menem, who abandoned much of the populist Peronist platform during his presidency, in the 1990s.

Antonio died in 2007, a few months short of his 90th birthday. He had five children with his first wife Esmeralda, and three more were adopted in Spain.

References

1917 births
2007 deaths
Argentine people of Syrian descent
20th-century Argentine businesspeople
Businesspeople from Buenos Aires
Adolf Eichmann
Argentine expatriates in Uruguay